Machine Project was a Los Angeles based not-for-profit arts organization and community event space.

History 
Founded by Mark Allen, Machine Project launched in 2003 with its inaugural show, 'Tom Jennings - Story Teller,' an installation produced by Tom Jennings, which was displayed from December 6, 2003 until January 24, 2004. In the museums first year, it displayed six different exhibits. 
 
Machine Project later moved toward larger collaborations, holding residences with major art museums, including a one-day takeover of the Los Angeles County Museum of Art (LACMA) on November 15, 2008 featuring 10 hours of performances, and a several month residency at the Hammer Museum in 2010, resulting in 80 programs including a series of micro-concerts in a coatroom. 

In 2014, Machine Projects intervened in the Gamble House in Pasadena, an early 20th century Craftsman home that once belonged to David and Mary Gamble, of Procter & Gamble fame. Allen and a group of artists affiliated with Machine Project installed a series of contemporary artworks around the historic home in ways that both highlighted and harmonized with the architecture. This included a secret basement restaurant operated by Bob Dornberger whose menu was inspired by the architecture, and a massive sculpture of a vortex on the front lawn by Patrick Ballard that was also a puppet. 

Machine Project announced its closure in January 2018.

References

External links
 Machine Project's Website

Performance art in Los Angeles
Art in Greater Los Angeles
Non-profit organizations based in Los Angeles
Arts organizations based in California